Inteja Dominican Cycling Team is a Dominican UCI Continental cycling team established in 2015.

Team roster

Major wins
2015
Stage 7 Tour Cycliste International de la Guadeloupe, Diego Milan
Stage 9 Tour Cycliste International de la Guadeloupe, Antonio Pedrero
Tobago Cycling Classic, Adderlyn Cruz

2016
 Time Trial Championships, William Guzman
 Road Race Championships, Juan José Cueto

2017
Stage 2 Vuelta Independencia Nacional Republica Dominicana, Albert Torres
Stage 1 Tour Cycliste International de la Guadeloupe, Julio Alberto Amores

2018
Prologue Tour Cycliste International de la Guadeloupe, Jose Alfredo Aguirre

National champions
2016
 Dominican Republic Road Race Championship, Juan José Cueto
 Dominican Republic Time Trial Championship, William Guzmán

References

UCI Continental Teams (America)
Cycling teams established in 2015
2015 establishments in the Dominican Republic
Cycling teams based in the Dominican Republic